Club Superstation was a short-lived Australian satellite television service operating from 1985 to 1987.

Based in Sydney, Club Superstation commenced transmissions from 14 October 1986, giving it the distinction of being the first Australian subscription television service. Programming consisted of sports events ranging from football, boxing, darts and greyhound racing from around the world, as well as a music video programme between matches. The channel was distributed exclusively to hotels and clubs in New South Wales via satellite. Club Superstation was also notable for launching the television careers of Richard Wilkins and Peter Overton, who would both later continue working for the Nine Network.

Club Superstation was acquired by Alan Bond in June 1987, and was absorbed into Bond's Sky Channel.

References 

Television channels and stations established in 1985
English-language television stations in Australia
Defunct television channels in Australia
Sports television networks in Australia